The de Havilland DH.51 is a 1920s British three-seat touring biplane built by de Havilland at Stag Lane Aerodrome, Edgware.

Design and development
De Havilland designed the DH.51 as an economical touring biplane, based on the 90 hp (67 kW) RAF 1A engine which was available from war-surplus stocks. The aircraft first flew in July 1924; it performed well but because it did not have a dual-ignition system it was refused a certificate of airworthiness. As it would have taken at least ten hours of flight testing to certify it with a single-ignition system, de Havilland decided to re-engine the aircraft instead. The aircraft was fitted with an ADC Airdisco Air-cooled V8 piston engine, which considerably improved performance but was no longer cheap to operate. As a result, only three aircraft were built. The first aircraft was fitted with single-bay wings and was designated the DH.51A. It was exported to Australia and later converted to a floatplane as the DH.51B.

Operational service
The first aircraft was exported to Australia in 1927, as a floatplane it capsized in Sydney Harbour in January 1931. The second aircraft was used in Britain until it was scrapped in 1933. The third aircraft was exported to Kenya in 1929. It returned to Britain in 1965 and is still in use today.

Surviving aircraft
The third aircraft built (registered G-EBIR and named Miss Kenya; built in 1925) is still airworthy and on public display at the Shuttleworth Collection, Old Warden, England.

Specifications (DH.51 Airdisco engine)

See also

References

External links

Photo of a De Havilland DH-51 Moth

Single-engined tractor aircraft
Biplanes
1920s British civil utility aircraft
DH.051
Aircraft first flown in 1924